{{Speciesbox
| image = A_picture_of_Convoluta_convoluta_with_an_American_Penny_for_scale.jpg
| image_caption = C. convoluta with a coin 19 mm in diameter
| taxon = Convoluta convoluta
| authority = Peter Christian Abildgaard, 1806. In: O.F. Müller, Zoologia Danica, 4.
| synonyms = 
 Convoluta albicinctaSchultze, 1851
 Convoluta armataGraff, 1874
 Convoluta diesingiiSchmidt, 1852
 Convoluta haustrumDalyell, 1853
 Convoluta infundibulumSchmidt, 1861
 Convoluta johnstoniDiesing, 1862
 Convoluta paradoxaØrsted, 1843
 Monotus albicinctus (Schultze, 1849)
 Monotus diesingi Schmidt, 1861
 Monotus johnstoni Diesing, 1862 (nomen nudum)
 Monotus paradoxaClaperede, 1861
 Planaria convolutaAbildgaard, 1806

|synonyms_ref =  
}}Convoluta convoluta is a small acoel in the family Convolutidae. Native to the Baltic Sea, it invaded the Gulf of Maine in the late 1990s.

Diet and symbiosis
This flatworm consumes juvenile settling mussels and harpacticoid copepods. It also engages in a symbiosis with a diatom of the genus Lichmophora'', which has also invaded the Gulf of Maine.

Impact and ecology in the Gulf of Maine
In the Gulf of Maine, the impact of this species appears minimal as the habitat is presumably saturated with food, and the species is ultimately self-limited by species competition. It also appears limited to wave-protected habitats, where it prefers filamentous algae. In 2001, it occurred in densities of up to 19 per square centimeter.

References 

Acoelomorphs
Animals described in 1806